Dietmar Geilich is an East German Olympic boxer. He represented his country in the light-flyweight division at the 1976 Summer Olympics, as well as the 1980 Summer Olympics. He lost his first match against Armando Guevara in 1976. In 1980, he defeated Birender Singh Thapa in his first match, defeated Pedro Manuel Nieves in his second, and then lost to Shamil Sabirov, the eventual gold medalist, in his third bout.

References

1954 births
Living people
East German male boxers
Olympic boxers of East Germany
Boxers at the 1976 Summer Olympics
Boxers at the 1980 Summer Olympics
People from Görlitz
AIBA World Boxing Championships medalists
Light-flyweight boxers
Sportspeople from Saxony